Syed Ali Raza Usama is a Pakistani TV, drama (serial) director at Geo Tv and former creative director at AAJ TV. As a film director, he directed acclaimed drama serials such as Bashar Momin and Khuda Aur Muhabbat (season 1). He also directed Aakhir Kab Tak which is currently airing on Hum TV.

As a drama director
 Bashar Momin
 Kash Mein Teri Beti Na Hoti
 I hate You (telefilm)
 Sultanat-e-Dil
 Maryam
Dil Ishq
 Teri Meri Jodi (2015—16)
Khuda Aur Muhabbat
 Tere Bina (2017)
 Shayad (2017–18)
Khalish
Ab Dekh Khuda Kya Karta Hai (2018)
 Dil-e-Bereham (2019)
Mera Dil Mera Dushman
 Aakhir Kab Tak (2021)

As a film director 
 Main Hoon Shahid Afridi

References

External links 
 
 

People from Karachi
1980 births
Muhajir people
Pakistani music video directors
Pakistani record producers
Living people